The 1902 South Carolina gubernatorial election was held on November 4, 1902, to select the governor of the state of South Carolina. Duncan Clinch Heyward won the Democratic primary and ran unopposed in the general election to become the 88th governor of South Carolina.

Democratic primary
The South Carolina Democratic Party held their primary for governor on August 26 and Duncan Clinch Heyward emerged as the frontrunner. His victory against W. Jasper Talbert, a congressman of the 2nd congressional district, in the runoff on September 9 came as a surprise because Heyward was relatively unknown outside of Colleton County. Heyward, an aristocratic planter, attributed his win due to running a "clean and sincere campaign."

General election
The general election was held on November 4, 1902, and Duncan Clinch Heyward was elected the next governor of South Carolina without opposition. Being a non-presidential election and few contested races, turnout was much less than the previous gubernatorial election.

 

|-
| 
| colspan=5 |Democratic hold
|-

See also
Governor of South Carolina
List of governors of South Carolina
South Carolina gubernatorial elections

Notes

References

"Report of the Secretary of State to the General Assembly of South Carolina." Reports and Resolutions of the General Assembly of the State of South Carolina. Volume II. Columbia, South Carolina: 1903, pp. 1374–1375.

External links
SCIway Biography of Duncan Clinch Heyward

1902 United States gubernatorial elections
1902
Gubernatorial
November 1902 events